Marieville is a city in the Canadian province of Quebec. The population as of the Canada 2011 Census was 10,094.

History
In 1708, Sieur Claude de Ramezey obtained a parcel of land which was named the Monnoir manor. Population increased starting at around 1740. It became a parish in 1832 and officially an incorporated municipality in 1858 and later an incorporated city in 1905. In 2000, the parish of Sainte-Marie-de-Monnoir, which previously demerged from Marieville in 1855 was re-merged. Its main economic activity today is still agriculture.

Geography
Marieville is accessible via Quebec Autoroute 10, which runs from Montreal to Sherbrooke via Granby and Magog. Quebec Route 112 is a route that runs parallel to A-10 but through the municipality but continues north of Sherbrooke toward Thetford Mines. Quebec Route 227 is the secondary road that connects A-10 to the centre of Marieville and runs south towards Champlain Lake and north towards Quebec Autoroute 20 near Sainte-Madeleine.

Demographics 

Population trend:

(R) Revised count - Statistics Canada - February 10, 2009.
(+) Amalgamation with Parish of Sainte-Marie-de-Monnoir on June 14, 2000.

Mother tongue language (2006)

Markets
Marieville has its own Christmas Market. There were Christmas Markets since 2010. It also has its Public Market from June to October, since June 2012.

Government

City Council
 Caroline Gagnon, mayor

Education

The South Shore Protestant Regional School Board previously served the municipality.

People
Kevin Owens, WWE wrestler, was born and raised in Marieville

See also
 List of cities in Quebec
 CIT Chambly-Richelieu-Carignan, which provides commuter and local bus services

References

External links

 City of Marieville website (French only)
 Marieville's Public Market website (French only)

Cities and towns in Quebec
Incorporated places in Rouville Regional County Municipality